Jeunesse Sportive de Poto-Poto is a Congolese football club based in the city of Brazzaville in the Republic of the Congo. They currently play in the top domestic Congo Premier League.

External links
Soccerway

Football clubs in the Republic of the Congo
Sports clubs in Brazzaville